The High Butte Effigy and Village Site (32ME13) is an ancient Native American ceremonial site near the Garrison Dam and Riverdale, North Dakota.  The site was listed on the National Register of Historic Places in 1978.  It is located atop a butte and includes a "turf cut turtle effigy."  Items recovered from the site include 14 points, 24 body sherds, five rim sherds, and a grooved paddle.

The property is protected by the State Historical Society of North Dakota and is known as Turtle Effigy State Historic Site.

References

External links
 Turtle Effigy State Historic Site - State Historical Society of North Dakota

Archaeological sites on the National Register of Historic Places in North Dakota
Protected areas of Mercer County, North Dakota
North Dakota State Historic Sites
National Register of Historic Places in Mercer County, North Dakota
Turtles in art
Native American history of North Dakota